Route 725 is a  long mostly north–south secondary highway in the southwestern portion of New Brunswick, Canada. Most of the route is in Charlotte County.

The route starts at a dead end at the Canada–US border northwest of Upper Little Ridge. The road travels southeast through a mostly forested area to the southern terminus of Route 730 then through the communities of Upper Little Ridge, Little Ridge, and Lower Little Ridge. The road then begins to turn east, passes Barter Settlement, and ends in Five Corners just outside Saint Stephen at the southern terminus of Route 735 and the eastern terminus of Route 740.

See also

References

725
725